George Alan Cleveland (September 17, 1885 – July 15, 1957) was a Canadian film actor.  He appeared in more than 180 films between 1930 and 1954.

Career
Cleveland was born in Sydney, Nova Scotia, Canada. His first appearance on the stage was in The Octaroon as a teenager. Cleveland was active as a Vaudevillian before  moving to Hollywood in 1936 where he worked in films via acting, producing and directing.

Although Cleveland played in more than 150 films during his 58-year career in show business, he acknowledged that he was most well-known for his role as George "Gramps" Miller in the early years of the long running American television series Lassie. Cleveland appeared in the first three seasons (1954–1956) and in the first 12 episodes of the fourth season (1957). His death in July 1957 was written into the 13th episode of the fourth season (1957) and became the storyline motive for the selling of the farm and the departure of the Millers for Capitol City.

Cleveland died of a heart attack on July 15, 1957, in Burbank, California at age 71. He was survived by his spouse Dorothy Melleck, whom he married as a widower in 1955. Cleveland was previously married to Victory Bateman between 1910–1926, whom he had met while both actors were touring in Vaudeville.

Selected filmography

 The Thoroughbred (1930) - Detective (uncredited)
 Sky Raiders (1931) - John - the Air Dispatcher (uncredited)
 He Couldn't Take It (1933) - Drunk (uncredited)
 A Woman's Man (1934) - Announcer at Premiere (uncredited)
 Mystery Liner (1934) - Simms the Steward
 School for Girls (1934) - Reeves
 House of Mystery (1934) - Detective Clancy (uncredited)
 Voice in the Night (1934) - Worker (uncredited)
 City Limits (1934) - Graflex (uncredited)
 Blue Steel (1934) - Hank - Innkeeper
 The Man from Utah (1934) - Nevada Sheriff
 Monte Carlo Nights (1934) - Croupier
 The Star Packer (1934) - Jake - Cook (uncredited)
 Girl o' My Dreams (1934) - Newsreel Company Man (uncredited)
 The Hoosier Schoolmaster (1935) - Townsman (uncredited)
 Make a Million (1935) - Fake Blind Beggar
 The Keeper of the Bees (1935) - Judge
 She Gets Her Man (1935) - Drunk in Lunch Room (uncredited)
 Cheers of the Crowd (1935) - Newsreel Man (uncredited)
 The Public Menace (1935) - Ship's Pilot (uncredited)
 His Night Out (1935) - Detective
 The Spanish Cape Mystery (1935) - Jorum
 Forced Landing (1935) - Jolly
 I Conquer the Sea! (1936) - Caleb Ashley
 Black Gold (1936) - Clemmons
 Don't Get Personal (1936) - The Farmer
 Brilliant Marriage (1936) - Bartender
 Flash Gordon (1936, Serial) - Professor Hensley
 Rio Grande Romance (1936) - Sheriff Williams
 Revolt of the Zombies (1936) - Gen. Duval
 Two-Fisted Gentleman (1936) - Mr. Bainbridge
 Phantom Patrol (1936) - Inspector McCloud
 Robinson Crusoe of Clipper Island (1936) - Goebel - Gang Scientist
 North of Nome (1936) - Ship Captain
 The Plainsman (1936) - Van Ellyn Associate (uncredited)
 The Devil Diamond (1937) - George Davis
 Breezing Home (1937) - Politician (uncredited)
 Paradise Express (1937) - Farmer Beasley
 Swing It, Professor (1937) - Dean
 Night Key (1937) - Sam Adams - Company Engineer (uncredited)
 West Bound Limited (1937) - Division Superintendent (uncredited)
 The Toast of New York (1937) - Perkins - Luke's Secretary in Boston (uncredited)
 Atlantic Flight (1937) - Old-Timer in Diner (uncredited)
 Trapped by G-Men (1937) - Miner
 Small Town Boy (1937) - Police Station Man (unconfirmed)
 Behind the Mike (1937) - Stable Man
 A Girl with Ideas (1937) - Malladay (uncredited)
 Adventure's End (1937) - Tom
 Boy of the Streets (1937) - Tim 'Flannel-Mouth' Farley
 Prescription for Romance (1937) - Cab Driver (uncredited)
 The Lone Ranger (1938, Serial) - George Blanchard
 Born to Be Wild (1938) - Stevens (uncredited)
 The Port of Missing Girls (1938) - Clinton
 Rose of the Rio Grande (1938) - Pedro
 Flash Gordon's Trip to Mars (1938, Serial) - Professor Hensley (scenes deleted)
 Outlaws of Sonora (1938) - Association Director (uncredited)
 Romance of the Limberlost (1938) - Nathan
 Prison Break (1938) - Ding
 Under the Big Top (1938) - Joe
 The Strange Case of Dr. Meade (1938) - Thurber
 Ghost Town Riders (1938) - Judge Stillwell
 Convict's Code (1939) - Gas Station Attendant (uncredited)
 Home on the Prairie (1939) - Jim Wheeler
 The Phantom Stage (1939) - Sidekick Grizzly
 Streets of New York (1939) - Pop O'Toole
 Wolf Call (1939) - Dr. MacTavish
 Stunt Pilot (1939) - Sheriff
 Konga, the Wild Stallion (1939) - Tabor
 Dick Tracy's G-Men (1939, Serial) - Gramps Williams (uncredited)
 Mutiny in the Big House (1939) - Convict 'Dad' Schultz
 Overland Mail (1939) - Frank Porter - aka Saunders
Hidden Enemy (1940) - John MacGregor
 Chasing Trouble (1940) - Lester
 Pioneers of the West (1940) - Dr. Bailey
 Queen of the Yukon (1940) - Dr. Bailey
 Drums of Fu Manchu (1940, Serial) - Dr. James Parker [Ch.1]
 Midnight Limited (1940) - Prof. Van Dillon
 Blazing Six Shooters (1940) - Mark Rawlins
 Tomboy (1940) - Uncle Matt
 One Man's Law (1940) - Judge Wingate
 Haunted House (1940) - Albert Henshaw
 Queen of the Yukon (1940) - Grub
 The Ape (1940) - Mr. Howley (uncredited)
 West of Abilene (1940) - Bill Burnside
 The Wild Stallion (1940)
 Hi-Yo Silver (1940) - George Blanchard (archive footage)
 A Girl, a Guy and a Gob (1941) - Pop Duncan
 Nevada City (1941) - Hank Liddell
 Two in a Taxi (1941) - Gas Station Proprietor
 Sunset in Wyoming (1941) - Asa Wentworth
 Wide Open Town (1941) - Pete Carter - Miner (uncredited)
 Man at Large (1941) - Sheriff Pickering
 Riders of the Purple Sage (1941) - Doctor (uncredited)
 The Devil and Daniel Webster (1941) - Cy Bibber
 Look Who's Laughing (1941) - Kelsey
 Two-Faced Woman (1941) - Minor Role (uncredited)
 Playmates (1941) - Mr. Nelson Pennypacker (uncredited)
 Call Out the Marines (1942) - Bartender
 Obliging Young Lady (1942) - Clarence - Manager of Lake Mohawk Lodge
 Valley of the Sun (1942) - Bill Yard
 The Spoilers (1942) - Banty
 My Favorite Spy (1942) - Gus
 The Falcon Takes Over (1942) - Jerry - Servant (uncredited)
 Powder Town (1942) - Gus, Institute Janitor
 The Big Street (1942) - Colonel Samuel Venus
 Mexican Spitfire's Elephant (1942) - Chief Customs Inspector (uncredited)
 Highways by Night (1942) - Judkins - Hotel Manager
 Here We Go Again (1942) - Ramble Inn Proprietor (uncredited)
 Army Surgeon (1942) - Col. John Wishart
 Seven Miles from Alcatraz (1942) - Captain Porter
 The Traitor Within (1942) - 'Pop' Betts
 Ladies' Day (1943) - Doc, Sox Trainer
 Cowboy in Manhattan (1943) - Wild Bill
 The Man from Music Mountain (1943) - Sheriff Hal Darcey
 Klondike Kate (1943) - Judge Horace Crawford
 The Woman of the Town (1943) - Judge Blackburn
 It Happened Tomorrow (1944) - Mr. Gordon
 My Best Gal (1944) - Ralph Hodges
 Man from Frisco (1944) - Mayor Winter (uncredited)
 The Yellow Rose of Texas (1944) - Captain 'Cap' Joe
 Abroad with Two Yanks (1944) - Roderick Stuart
 My Pal Wolf (1944) - Wilson
 When the Lights Go On Again (1944) - Pat 'Gramps' Benson
 Alaska (1944) - Pete (Postmaster)
 Can't Help Singing (1944) - Marshal
 God Is My Co-Pilot (1945) - Father of Catherine Scott (uncredited)
 Song of the Sarong (1945) - Captain William Reemis
 It's in the Bag! (1945) - Busby - Hotel Manager
 Her Highness and the Bellboy (1945) - Dr. Elfson
 Sunbonnet Sue (1945) - Casey, Tavern Owner
 Senorita from the West (1945) - Cap
 Dakota (1945) - Mr. Plummer
 She Wouldn't Say Yes (1945) - Ticket Seller (uncredited)
 Pillow of Death (1945) - Samuel 'Sam' Kincaid
 Little Giant (1946) - Clarence Goodring
 The Runaround (1946) - Feenan the cabbie
 Boys' Ranch (1946) - Butch's Grandpa (uncredited)
 Courage of Lassie (1946) - Old Man
 Wild Beauty (1946) - Barney Skeets
 Step by Step (1946) - Captain Caleb Simpson
 Angel on My Shoulder (1946) - Albert
 Wake Up and Dream (1946) - Prof. Feverfew (uncredited)
 The Show-Off (1946) - Pop Fisher
 Easy Come, Easy Go (1947) - Gilligan
 I Wonder Who's Kissing Her Now (1947) - John McCullem
 Mother Wore Tights (1947) - Grandfather McKinley
 The Wistful Widow of Wagon Gap (1947) - Judge Benbow
 My Wild Irish Rose (1947) - Captain Brennan
 Albuquerque (1948) - John Armin
 Fury at Furnace Creek (1948) - Judge
 A Date with Judy (1948) - Gramps
 Miraculous Journey (1948) - The Hermit
 The Plunderers (1948) - Sheriff Sam Borden
 Rimfire (1949) - Judge Gardner
 Home in San Antone (1949) - Grandpa Gibson
 Kazan (1949) - Trapper
 Miss Grant Takes Richmond (1949) - Judge Ben Grant
 The Boy from Indiana (1950) - Robert Bruce Mac Dougall
 Please Believe Me (1950) - Mr. Cooper
 Trigger, Jr. (1950) - Colonel Harkrider
 Frenchie (1950) - Mayor Jefferson Harding
 Fort Defiance (1951) - Uncle Charlie Tallon
 Flaming Feather (1952) - Doc Fallon
 Carson City (1952) - Henry Dodson
 Cripple Creek (1952) - 'Hardrock' Hanson
 The WAC from Walla Walla (1952) - Gramps Canova
 San Antone (1953) - Colonel Allerby
 Affair with a Stranger (1953) - Pop
 Walking My Baby Back Home (1953) - Col. Dan Wallace
 Racing Blood (1954) - Gramps
 Untamed Heiress (1954) - Andrew 'Cactus' Clayton
 Fireman Save My Child (1954) - Chief Rorty
 The Outlaw's Daughter (1954) - Lem Creel

References

External links

1885 births
1957 deaths
Canadian male stage actors
Canadian male film actors
Canadian male television actors
Canadian expatriate male actors in the United States
People from Sydney, Nova Scotia
20th-century Canadian male actors